Lymexylon is a genus of beetles in the family Lymexylidae, containing the following species:

 Lymexylon amamianum Kurosawa, 1985
 Lymexylon miyakei Nakane, 1985
 Lymexylon navale (Linnaeus, 1758)
 Lymexylon persicum Fursov, 1935
 Lymexylon ruficolle Kurosawa, 1949

References

External links

Lymexylidae
Cucujoidea genera